Johnny Sears Jr. (born March 16, 1987) is a retired defensive back from the Canadian Football League (CFL). He previously played for the Toronto Argonauts, Hamilton Tiger-Cats and Winnipeg Blue Bombers. He played his college football at the University of Michigan, followed by Eastern Michigan. He wears number 0.

References

Living people
1987 births
American football defensive backs
Canadian football defensive backs
American players of Canadian football
Toronto Argonauts players
Michigan Wolverines football players
Eastern Michigan Eagles football players
Players of American football from California
Sportspeople from Fresno, California
Winnipeg Blue Bombers players
Hamilton Tiger-Cats players